Zdeněk Cieslar (born 13 December 1973) is a Czech footballer who played as a defender. He made 33 appearances over two seasons in the Czech First League between 1993 and 1995. In the 1993–94 season, he received three red cards, still a league record in 2013. He later played in the second level for Třinec.

References

External links
 
 

1973 births
Living people
Czech footballers
Czech Republic under-21 international footballers
Czech First League players
MFK Vítkovice players
FC Zbrojovka Brno players
FK Fotbal Třinec players
Association football defenders